The 2018–19 Arizona Wildcats women's basketball team represented University of Arizona during the 2018–19 NCAA Division I women's basketball season. The Wildcats, led by third-year head coach Adia Barnes, played their home games at the McKale Center and were members of the Pac-12 Conference. They finished the season of 24–13, 7–11 in Pac-12 play to finish in a tie for sixth place. They advanced to the quarterfinals of the Pac-12 women's tournament where they lost to Oregon. They received an at-large bid to the Women's National Invitation Tournament, where they advanced to the finals and defeated Northwestern for the championship.

Previous season
They finished the season 6–24, 2–16 in Pac-12 play to finish in eleventh place. They lost in the first round of the Pac-12 women's basketball tournament to Arizona State.

Off-season

Departures

Incoming transfers

Recruits

2020 recruiting class

Roster

Schedule

|-
!colspan=9 style=| Exhibition

|-
!colspan=9 style=| Non-conference regular season

|-
!colspan=9 style=| Pac-12 regular season

|-
!colspan=9 style=|Pac-12 Women's Tournament

|-
!colspan=9 style=|WNIT

Rankings

See also
2018–19 Arizona Wildcats men's basketball team

References

Arizona Wildcats women's basketball seasons
Women's National Invitation Tournament championship seasons
Arizona
Arizona Wildcats women's basketball
Arizona Wildcats women's basketball
Arizona